The United Nations Security Council Resolution 2268 was unanimously adopted on 26 February 2016. It is calling for a cessation of hostilities and a grant for access to humanitarian workers in Syria.

The resolution
The resolution endorsed the Joint Statement of the United States and the Russia of 22 February 2016 on "cessation of hostilities" and demanded that all parties to whom the cessation of hostilities applied fulfil their commitments thereunder, as well as "the full and immediate implementation of resolution 2254 (2015) to facilitate a Syrian-led and Syrian-owned political transition, in accordance with the Geneva communiqué as set forth in the ISSG Statements".

References

External links
Text of the Resolution at undocs.org

 2268
 2268
2016 in Syria
February 2016 events